Potanino is a rural locality (a settlement) and the administrative centre of Potaninskoye Rural Settlement, Bichursky District, Republic of Buryatia, Russia. The population was 850 as of 2017. There are 15 streets.

Geography 
Potanino is located 60 km northeast of Bichura (the district's administrative centre) by road. Novaya Zardama is the nearest rural locality.

References 

Rural localities in Bichursky District